Willi Roth (31 July 1929 – 2 May 2017) was a German boxer. He competed at the 1952 Summer Olympics and the 1956 Summer Olympics.

References

External links
 

1929 births
2017 deaths
German male boxers
Olympic boxers of Germany
Olympic boxers of the United Team of Germany
Boxers at the 1952 Summer Olympics
Boxers at the 1956 Summer Olympics
Featherweight boxers
People from Rhein-Neckar-Kreis